Viera Janárčeková (born 1941) is a Slovakian pianist and composer.

Biography
Viera Janárčeková was born in Svit, Slovakia. She studied harpsichord and piano the State Conservatory in Bratislava and continued her studies at the Academy of Performing Arts in Prague. She also studied with Rudolf Firkušný in Lucerne. After completing her education in 1967 she taught music and performed as a pianist. She has resided in Homberg, Germany since 1972, and has worked as a composer since 1981. She received an invitation to be composer-in-residence for the International Festival in Lockenhaus in 2000.

Works
Janárčeková composes mainly for chamber ensemble and instruments. Selected works include:
Quadratura for cello
Banyan for bass clarinet and trombone
Der Geheimnissvolle Nachen
Aschenputtel trio for clarinet, violincello and piano
String Quartet No. 5  
String Quartet No. 6
Sphärenwolf

Her works have been recorded and issued on CD, including:
Viera Janárčeková Duo extatico - Joriki und Makyo - Das 5. Streichquartett'Freya Ritts-Kirba, Violine - Hellmuth Vivell, Klavier - Martin Weiffenbach, Violoncello - Kairos Quartet

References

1941 births
Living people
20th-century classical composers
Women classical composers
Slovak composers
Slovak classical pianists
21st-century classical composers
20th-century pianists
21st-century pianists
Women classical pianists
20th-century women composers
21st-century women composers
20th-century women pianists
21st-century women pianists